Jorunn Elisabet Gleditsch Lossius (born 29 February 1980) is a Norwegian politician for the Christian Democratic Party.

Education  
Lossius has studied christianity, drama/theater and history at the University of Agder.

Political career

Parliament
She served as a deputy representative to the Parliament of Norway from Aust-Agder during the term 2017–2021. In 2019 she moved up to full representative as Kjell Ingolf Ropstad entered Solberg's Cabinet. She was elected deputy member for Vest-Agder in the 2021 election. At the time of election she was also deputy mayor of Lillesand.

She caused a lot of attention in April 2021, after posting a picture on Facebook of her pregnant belly. The picture was a reaction on the Socialist Left Party's decision to extend the limit for self-determined abortion from the current Norwegian law which allows 12 weeks, to 22 weeks.

References

1980 births
Living people
People from Lillesand
Members of the Storting
Christian Democratic Party (Norway) politicians
Aust-Agder politicians
Norwegian women in politics
Women members of the Storting
21st-century Norwegian politicians